Paul Ambros (23 June 1933 – 26 June 2015) was a German ice hockey player. He was part of the United Team of Germany, which represented the country at the 1956, 1960 and 1964 Winter Olympics.

Born in Füssen, Germany, Ambros played for EV Füssen from 1949 until 1965, scoring more than 60 goals in 200 games and helping his team win the Spengler Cup in 1965. He then played for Augsburger EV from 1965 until 1973. He was often referred as "Der Tiger vom Hopfensee (The Tiger from Hopfensee)".

Ambros is a member of the German Ice Hockey Hall of Fame.

Ambros died on 26 June 2015 at the age of 82, following a lengthy undisclosed illness. He is survived by his wife, Inge.

References

External links
 
 

1933 births
2015 deaths
German ice hockey defencemen
Ice hockey players at the 1956 Winter Olympics
Ice hockey players at the 1960 Winter Olympics
Ice hockey players at the 1964 Winter Olympics
Olympic ice hockey players of Germany
Sportspeople from Füssen
Olympic ice hockey players of the United Team of Germany